Methano(10)annulene may refer to:

1,5-Methano(10)annulene
1,6-Methano(10)annulene